Guzmania terrestris is a plant species in the genus Guzmania. This species is endemic to State of Amazonas in southern Venezuela.

References

terrestris
Flora of Venezuela
Plants described in 1987